Whitney Independent School District is a public school district based in Whitney, Texas (USA).

In 2009, the school district was rated "academically acceptable" by the Texas Education Agency.

The mission statement of the school district is for all students to be a champion every day. Therefore, WISD strives to be an effective, student-focused community of teaching and learning which develops the abilities of each student by cultivating ethical character, leadership, intellectual interest and a responsibility to serve others.

Schools
Whitney High (grades 9-12)
Whitney Middle (grades 6-8)
Whitney Intermediate (grades 3-5)
Whitney Elementary (grades PK-2)

References

External links
Whitney ISD

School districts in Hill County, Texas